KKZI (1310 AM) is a radio station located in Barstow, California and serving the High Desert/Eastern Sierra area. The station is owned by Jeff Chang's Chang Broadcasting, which also owns KQTE in Helendale, California, and several low-power television stations.

The station is currently operating on a temporary 100-watt transmitter after losing the use of its former site.

References

External links

KZI
Mojave Desert
Owens Valley
KZI
Radio stations established in 1960
1960 establishments in California